Aero Bravo is a Brazilian aircraft manufacturer founded in 1993 in Belo Horizonte. The firm manufactures light aircraft of its own design and under license.

Aircraft

External links

Aircraft manufacturers of Brazil
Companies based in Minas Gerais
Companies established in 1993
Brazilian brands